The 79th World Science Fiction Convention (Worldcon), also known as DisCon III, was held on 15–19 December 2021 in Washington, D.C., United States.

Participants

Guests of Honor 

 artist John Harris
 author Nancy Kress
 fan Ben Yalow

Special Guests 

 Malka Older
 Sheree Renée Thomas
 Andrea Hairston

Awards

2021 Hugo Awards 

The winners were:

 Best Novel: Network Effect, by Martha Wells
 Best Novella: The Empress of Salt and Fortune, by Nghi Vo
 Best Novelette: "Two Truths and a Lie", by Sarah Pinsker
 Best Short Story: "Metal Like Blood in the Dark", by T. Kingfisher
 Best Series: The Murderbot Diaries, by Martha Wells
 Best Related Work: Beowulf: A New Translation, by Maria Dahvana Headley
 Best Graphic Story: Parable of the Sower: A Graphic Novel Adaptation, written by Octavia E. Butler, adapted by Damian Duffy, illustrated by John Jennings
 Best Dramatic Presentation, Long Form: The Old Guard, written by Greg Rucka, directed by Gina Prince-Bythewood
 Best Dramatic Presentation, Short Form: The Good Place: "Whenever You’re Ready", written and directed by Michael Schur
 Best Professional Editor, Long Form: Diana M. Pho
 Best Professional Editor, Short Form: Ellen Datlow
 Best Professional Artist: Rovina Cai
 Best Semiprozine: FIYAH Magazine of Black Speculative Fiction
 Best Fanzine: nerds of a feather, flock together
 Best Fancast: The Coode Street Podcast, presented by Jonathan Strahan and Gary K. Wolfe, produced by Jonathan Strahan
 Best Fan Writer: Elsa Sjunneson
 Best Fan Artist: Sara Felix
 Best Video Game: Hades, publisher and developer Supergiant Games

Other awards 

The winners were:

 Lodestar Award for Best Young Adult Book: A Wizard's Guide to Defensive Baking, by T. Kingfisher
 Astounding Award for Best New Writer: Emily Tesh

Site selection 

DC in 2021 was the only bid which officially filed to host the 79th World Science Fiction Convention, and its selection was confirmed by vote of the members of the 77th World Science Fiction Convention.

Notes 

The convention was originally scheduled to take place 25–29 August, but was rescheduled to 15–19 December because of the COVID-19 pandemic.

See also 

 Hugo Award
 Science fiction
 Speculative fiction
 World Science Fiction Society
 Worldcon

References

External links 

 
 
 List of current Worldcon bids

2021 conferences
Science fiction conventions in the United States
Worldcon